Independent Publishers Group (IPG) is a worldwide distributor for independent general, academic, and professional publishers, founded in 1971 to exclusively market titles from independent client publishers to the international book trade. As per other book wholesalers and distributors, IPG combines its client publishers’ books into a single list, comparable to the larger publishing houses. IPG’s distribution services to publishers include warehousing, bill collecting, and sales to the book trade. IPG currently represents about 1,000 publishers. They are based in Chicago, Illinois. IPG distributes publishers based in Australia, the United Kingdom, Canada, France, Ireland, Switzerland, New Zealand, Israel, and others.

Merger with Chicago Review Press

In 1987, IPG was acquired by Chicago Review Press (CRP) an independent publisher founded at about the same time as IPG.

Acquisition of other book distributors
IPG acquired Paul & Company, an 11-year-old distributor of university presses, in 2001. IPG now sells directly to universities.

In 2006, IPG acquired Trafalgar Square Publishing, founded in 1973, which is the distributor of more than 100 publishers from the UK, Australia, New Zealand, China, and Germany, representing more than 20,000 titles. Its roster includes HarperCollins, Pan Macmillan, and Penguin Random House from the UK and Allen and Unwin and Penguin Random House from Australia; these publishers’ titles are not always issued in US editions.

In 2018, IPG acquired International Specialized Book Services (ISBS), an academic book distributor.

In August 2018, IPG acquired the book distributor, Midpoint Trade Books. Speaking to Publishers Weekly, IPG's CEO, Joe Matthews said that the publishing industry "is consolidating because distribution rewards scale, requires expensive technology, and demands high-level access to customers."

Represented publishers
 John Blake Publishing Ltd, founded in 1991

See also
List of book distributors
Chicago Review Press

References

External links

Book publishing companies based in Illinois
Publishing companies established in 1971
Book distributors